Ahmed Mohamed Osama (born 17 July 1963) is a Sudanese table tennis player. He competed in the men's singles event at the 1996 Summer Olympics.

References

1963 births
Living people
Sudanese male table tennis players
Olympic table tennis players of Sudan
Table tennis players at the 1996 Summer Olympics
Place of birth missing (living people)